Crittenden County is a county located in the U.S. state of Arkansas. As of the 2020 census, the population was 48,163. The county seat is Marion, and the largest city is West Memphis. Located in the Arkansas Delta, Crittenden County is Arkansas's 12th county, formed October 22, 1825, and named for Robert Crittenden, the first Secretary of the Arkansas Territory.

Crittenden County is part of the Memphis, TN-MS-AR Metropolitan Statistical Area. Most of the county's media comes from Memphis, although some Little Rock TV (Arkansas Educational Television Network, KATV) is imported by Comcast Cable. It lies within Arkansas's 1st congressional district.

Geography

Adjacent counties

 Mississippi County (northeast)
 Tipton County, Tennessee (east)
 Shelby County, Tennessee (east)
 DeSoto County, Mississippi (southeast)
 Tunica County, Mississippi (south)
 Lee County (southwest)
 St. Francis County (west)
 Cross County (west)
 Poinsett County (northwest)

National protected area
 Wapanocca National Wildlife Refuge

Demographics

2020 census

As of the 2020 United States Census, there were 48,163 people, 19,074 households, and 11,964 families residing in the county.

2010 census
As of the 2010 census, there were 50,902 people living in the county. 51.2% were Black or African American, 46.1% White, 0.6% Asian, 0.3% Native American, 0.8% of some other race and 1.1% of two or more races. 2.0% were Hispanic or Latino (of any race).

2000 census
As of the 2000 census, there were 50,866 people, 18,471 households, and 13,373 families living in the county. There were 20,507 housing units at an average density of 34 per square mile (13/km2). The racial makeup of the county was 50.91% White, 47.05% Black or African American, 0.24% Native American, 0.47% Asian, 0.02% Pacific Islander, 0.66% from other races, and 0.64% from two or more races. 1.42% of the population were Hispanic or Latino of any race.

There were 18,471 households, out of which 37.40% had children under the age of 18 living with them, 45.80% were married couples living together, 21.30% had a female householder with no husband present, and 27.60% were non-families. 23.70% of all households were made up of individuals, and 8.00% had someone living alone who was 65 years of age or older. The average household size was 2.72 and the average family size was 3.23.

In the county, the population was spread out, with 31.10% under the age of 18, 9.40% from 18 to 24, 29.10% from 25 to 44, 20.50% from 45 to 64, and 9.90% who were 65 years of age or older. The median age was 32 years. For every 100 females there were 91.00 males. For every 100 females age 18 and over, there were 85.00 males.

The median income for a household in the county was $30,109, and the median income for a family was $34,982. Males had a median income of $31,299 versus $21,783 for females. The per capita income for the county was $14,424. About 21.00% of families and 25.30% of the population were below the poverty line, including 35.30% of those under age 18 and 23.70% of those age 65 or over.

Education

Elementary and secondary education
Public education for elementary and secondary school students is available from Marion School District, West Memphis School District Earle School District, which leads to graduation from Earle High School. The Old Earle High School is listed on the National Register of Historic Places. Is also available in West Memphis and Marion.

Postsecondary education
Crittenden County is served by Arkansas State University Mid-South in West Memphis. The college offers bachelor's and master's degree programs in conjunction with Arkansas State University, The University of Arkansas, The University of Central Arkansas, Arkansas Tech University and Franklin University.

Healthcare
Crittenden County was served by 152 Bed Crittenden Regional Hospital in West Memphis until late August 2014. The hospital operated a number of outpatient clinics in Marion and West Memphis and a Pediatric Dental Clinic in cooperation with the UT Dental School. Crittenden Regional Hospital has closed the ER and will permanently close on 7 September 2014.

The nearest hospitals are located in Memphis, Tennessee.

The Arkansas Department of Health operates a clinic in West Memphis.

A number of private clinics also operate in Marion and West Memphis.

Government

Transportation

Major highways

 Interstate 40
 Interstate 55
 U.S. Highway 61
 U.S. Highway 63
 U.S. Highway 64
 U.S. Highway 70
 U.S. Highway 79
 Highway 38
 Highway 42
 Highway 50
 Highway 77
 Highway 118
 Highway 131
 Highway 147
 Highway 149
 Highway 184
 Highway 191
 Highway 218
 Highway 816

Airports
Crittenden County is served by the West Memphis Municipal Airport (KAWM), a General Aviation facility with a Control Tower and Instrument Landing capabilities. General DeWitt Spain Airport is a civil aviation airport just north of downtown Memphis.

The Memphis International Airport is nearby and provides commercial aviation through numerous carriers and is the international cargo hub for FedEx.

Rail
Union Pacific operates a 600 Acre intermodal facility west of Marion, Arkansas. BNSF Railway also operates a yard in Marion.

Limited Passenger Rail is available on Amtrak at Memphis Central Station in nearby Memphis. The City of New Orleans runs twice daily on a north–south route from Chicago to New Orleans.

Water
Crittenden County and West Memphis jointly operate a port on the Mississippi River. The International Port of Memphis lies just across the Mississippi River via  Interstate 55. The International Port of Memphis is the 4th largest inland port in the United States.

Communities

Cities
 Earle
 Marion (county seat)
 Turrell
 West Memphis

Towns

 Anthonyville
 Crawfordsville
 Clarkedale
 Edmondson
 Gilmore
 Horseshoe Lake
 Jennette
 Jericho
 Sunset

Townships

 Black Oak
 Bob Ward (Anthonyville, Edmondson, small part of Jennette)
 Fogleman (Gilmore, Turrell)
 Jackson (Crawfordsville, part of Marion, part of West Memphis small part of Jennette)
 Jasper (Sunset, most of Marion, part of West Memphis, small part of Clarkedale)
 Lucas (Horseshoe Lake)
 Mississippi (most of West Memphis, part of Marion)
 Mound City (part of Marion, part of West Memphis, small part of Clarkedale)
 Proctor (part of West Memphis)
 Tyronza (Earle, most of Jennette)
 Wappanocca (Jericho, most of Clarkedale)

See also
 List of lakes in Crittenden County, Arkansas
 National Register of Historic Places listings in Crittenden County, Arkansas

References

 
1825 establishments in Arkansas Territory
Populated places established in 1825
Counties in the Memphis metropolitan area
Arkansas counties on the Mississippi River
Black Belt (U.S. region)
Majority-minority counties in Arkansas